England National Blind Cricket Team represents England at blind cricket. England blind cricket team participated in the inaugural edition of the Blind Cricket World Cup in 1998. The England blind cricket team also mainly participates in T20 Internationals and One Dayers.

Nathan Foy is one of the most experienced blind cricketers to have played for England is the highest ever runscorer in blind cricket history aggregating 3500+ runs.

Tournament History

40 Over Blind Cricket World Cup 
 1998 Blind Cricket World Cup - Groupstage
 2002 Blind Cricket World Cup - Semifinals
 2006 Blind Cricket World Cup - Groupstage
 2014 Blind Cricket World Cup - Groupstage

Blind T20 World Cup 
 2012 Blind World T20 - Semifinals
 2017 Blind World T20 - Semifinals

References

External links 
  of Blind Cricket England & Wales (BCEW)

Blind cricket teams
C